= The National Rural and Family Magazine =

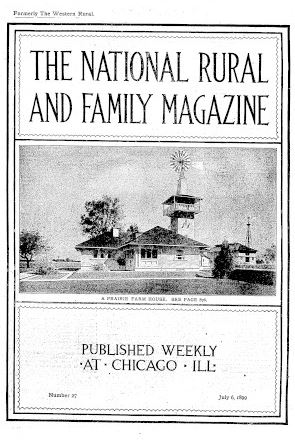
- Type: Weekly newspaper
- Founded: 1898
- Headquarters: Chicago, Illinois

The National Rural and Family Magazine was a weekly newspaper published in Chicago, Illinois in 1898 and into the early 20th century. It was formerly published as Western Rural before changing its name.
